Central Bank of China may refer to:

People's Bank of China, the Central Bank of the People's Republic of China
Central Bank of the Republic of China (Taiwan)

See also
Bank of China, state-owned commercial bank in China